Stavropolskaya Aktsionernaya Avia Flight 1023 was a charter flight between Stavropol in southern Russia and Trabzon in Turkey operated by the Russian airline Stavropolskaya Aktsionernaya Avia. On 18 March 1997 the Antonov An-24 operating the flight suffered a structural failure and crashed into a forest, killing all 50 passengers and crew on board.

Accident
The flight, which was a frequently operated charter between Stavropol and Trabzon on the Black Sea coast of Turkey, took off from Stavropol Shpakovskoye Airport, carrying 8 crew members, 41 passengers, mainly traders who planned to purchase cheap consumer goods in Turkey and one of the directors of the airline.

The flight was at a height of  37 minutes after take off, when air traffic control lost contact with it.

Wreckage of the Antonov An-24 was found scattered over a wide area in a forest near the village of Prigorodny, east of Cherkessk, northern Caucasus. All 50 people aboard were killed.

Cause

The accident investigation found that the aircraft, which had recently returned from an extended period of service in Congo, suffered massive corrosion which had caused the aircraft's tail to break off in flight.

The accident was blamed on a failure to detect corrosion during inspection, with the allowable time between inspections and maintenance being exceeded.

References

 "Airline Safety Review". Flight International, 21 – 27 January 1998. p. 38.
 "Airscene: Commercial Accidents". Air International, May 1997, Vol 52 No 5. p. 266. ISSN 0306-5634.
 "Airscene: Commercial Accidents". Air International, August 1997, Vol 53 No 2. p. 73. ISSN 0306-5634.
 "An-24 crashes en route to Turkey". Flight International, 26 March – 1 April 1997, p. 5.

Aviation accidents and incidents in 1997
Aviation accidents and incidents in Russia
Accidents and incidents involving the Antonov An-24
1997 disasters in Russia
History of Karachay-Cherkessia
Stavropol
March 1997 events in Russia
Transport in Karachay-Cherkessia